Kevin Walker may refer to:

People
Kev Walker, British comic book artist
Kevin Walker (baseball) (born 1976), American professional baseball coach and former pitcher
Kevin Walker (cornerback) (born 1963), former American football cornerback
Kevin Walker (linebacker) (born 1965), former American football linebacker
Kevin Walker (Swedish footballer) (born 1989), Swedish football player and singer. Winner of Swedish Idol in 2013
Kevin Walker (Scottish footballer) (born 1991), Scottish football goalkeeper
Geordie Walker (Kevin Walker, born 1958), British rock musician

Other
Kevin Walker (Brothers & Sisters), a character on the television show Brothers & Sisters

See also
 
 
 Kevin (disambiguation)
 Walker (disambiguation)